"Love Ain't Like That" is a song written by Tim Gaetano and A. J. Masters, and recorded by American country music artist Faith Hill.  It was released in January 1999 as the fourth single from her album Faith.  The song reached number 12 on the Billboard Hot Country Singles & Tracks chart in April 1999.

Critical reception
Deborah Evans Price of Billboard gave the song a favorable review, writing that "the lyric is a rich tapestry exploring the complex nature of love, and Hill's vocal oozes soulful emotion."

Chart performance

Year-end charts

References

1999 singles
1998 songs
Faith Hill songs
Song recordings produced by Byron Gallimore
Warner Records singles
Songs written by A. J. Masters